God's Own Country is a 2014 Indian Malayalam-language film directed by Vasudevan Sanal. The film was initially titled RED (Rare Emotional Day).

Plot synopsis
God's Own Country is a three interwoven story. A taxi driver desperately seeking money for his daughter's operation, Manu travelling to Kerala to earn bail money for his wife, Asha. And, a public prosecutor striving to punish a rapist.

Cast

 Fahadh Faasil as Manu Krishna
 Isha Talwar as Asha, Manu's wife
 Sreenivasan as Advocate Mathan Tharakan 
 Lal as Muhammed
 Nandhu as Vakkachan
 VK Sreeraman
 Vijayakumar as CI
 Manikuttan 
 Mythili as Abhirami
 Baby Gadha as Manu's daughter
 Lena as Serena
 Vishnupriya as Lekha
 Usha as Muhammed's wife
 Anju Aravind as Mathan Tharakan's wife
 Lakshmipriya as Pushpa 
 Santhakumari as Vakkachan's mother
 Molly Kanamaly (supporting role)
 Sudheer Karamana as Kunjikka
 Prashanth Alexander as Nandu
 Faisal Fareed as Sharjah Police Officer
 Daya Ashwathy as Reporter

Soundtrack
Gopi Sundar composed the music. Jassie Gift sang the song "Chalanam".

Reception 
The Times of India gave the film a rating of three-and-a-half out of five stars and wrote that "The movie, which has a few parallel narratives, has that deeply evocative humane quotient which makes each of its characters not just the leads, but also pure human beings". Rediff gave the film two out of five stars and stated that "God's Own Country is over-written -- characters explain everything in words when a mere change of expression would do".

References

External links
 

2014 films
2010s Malayalam-language films
Films scored by Gopi Sundar